Vand may refer to:

 VAND, the ICAO airport code for Nanded Airport (Shri Guru Gobind Singh Ji Airport), in India
 Vand., the botanical abbreviation for Domenico Vandelli
 129595 Vand (1997 VD), the asteroid, whose name is "Vand"
 Nu Andromedae (ν And), the naked eye binary star

See also
 
 Andromeda V (And V), a galaxy
 5 Andromedae (5 And), a star
 VAND (disambiguation)